Rear Admiral John Hildred Carlill OBE, DL (24 October 1925 – 10 November 2015) was a Royal Navy officer who became President of the Royal Naval College, Greenwich.

Naval career
Educated at the Royal Naval College, Dartmouth, Carlill joined the Royal Navy in 1939 and served in World War II in the cruiser HMS Mauritius. He became Secretary to the Flag Officer Naval Air Command, Director of Naval Manning and Training at the Ministry of Defence and then Secretary to the Second Sea Lord. He went on to be President of the Admiralty Inverview Board before becoming Commodore commanding the shore establishment HMS Drake in 1977 and then Admiral President of the Royal Naval College, Greenwich in 1980 before retiring in 1982.

In retirement he became Secretary of the Engineering Council. He died on 10 November 2015.

References

1925 births
2015 deaths
Royal Navy rear admirals
Officers of the Order of the British Empire
Admiral presidents of the Royal Naval College, Greenwich